Shirataki (often written with the hiragana ) are translucent, gelatinous Japanese noodles made from the corm of the konjac plant. They are part of traditional Japanese cuisine, but they are also valuable to people with allergies or intolerances to wheat, gluten or eggs, or to people on a diet for their low caloric value.

Composition 
The konjac yam, whose corm (a thick underground stem) yields the yam-cake (konnyaku) from which the noodles are made, is also called devil's tongue yam or elephant yam.  The word shirataki means "white waterfall", referring to the appearance of these noodles. Shirataki noodles are made from 97% water and 3% konjac, which contains glucomannan, a water-soluble dietary fiber. They are very low in digestible carbohydrates and food energy, and have little flavor of their own.

Manufacture 
There used to be a difference in manufacturing methods. Producers in the Kansai region of Japan prepared shirataki (called ito konnyaku there) by cutting konnyaku jelly into threads, while producers in the Kantō region made the noodles by extruding konnyaku sol through small holes into a hot, concentrated lime solution. Modern producers make both types using the latter method.

Culinary use 
Shirataki noodles come in dry and soft "wet" forms in Asian markets and some supermarkets. When purchased wet, they are packaged in liquid. They normally have a shelf life of up to one year. Some brands require rinsing and sautéing or parboiling, as the water in the packaging has an odor some find unpleasant.

The noodles can also be drained and dry-roasted, which diminishes bitterness and gives the noodles a more pasta-like consistency. Dry-roasted noodles can be served in soup stock, sauce, or noodle soup.

Names and forms
Shirataki also goes by the names ito-konnyaku, yam noodles, and devil's tongue noodles. The form called ito konnyaku is generally thicker than shirataki, with a square cross section and a darker color. It is preferred in the Kansai region.

References

Low-carbohydrate diets
Japanese noodles